Le Bosc-Renoult is a commune in the Orne department in northwestern France.

Population

See also
Communes of the Orne department

References

Communes of Orne